"Taking It All Too Hard" is the sixth track from the 1983 album Genesis by Genesis. It is known for Tony Banks' work on his Yamaha CP-70 electric piano. It included the eighth track from the album, "Silver Rainbow," as the B-side.

Background
No music video was made for this single, and the song has never been performed live by the band. This was the last single for the band until the band's only No. 1 Billboard Hot 100 hit, "Invisible Touch", in 1986.

Cash Box said that "Collins’ versatile vocals help make this song another potential mega-hit."

Personnel 
 Phil Collins – drums, percussion, vocals 
 Tony Banks – keyboards
 Mike Rutherford – guitars, bass

Chart performance

References

1984 singles
Genesis (band) songs
Song recordings produced by Hugh Padgham
Songs written by Tony Banks (musician)
Songs written by Phil Collins
Songs written by Mike Rutherford
1983 songs
Atlantic Records singles